John Copeland Buckstone (9 September 1859 in Sydenham, London – 24 September 1924) was an English stage and film actor of the late Victorian and Edwardian eras, who was most famous for his 1901 stage play Scrooge, which was the basis for the first film version of A Christmas Carol in the same year. He was the son of the actor John Baldwin Buckstone and the brother of Lucy Isabella Buckstone.

Life and career
Buckstone appeared as Careless in School For Scandal at Theatre Royal, Dundee in 1877, alongside William Henry Chippendale (as Sir Peter Teazel), Caroline Hill (as Lady Teazel), Buckstone's sister Lucy (as Maria) and his father (as Sir Benjamin Backbite). Buckstone appeared in The Silver King at the Princess's Theatre, London, in 1882, He was in The Silver King at Wallack's Theatre in New York City in 1883 and also performed for Wallack in Victor Durand in 1885. He also appeared in The Admirable Crichton with H. B. Irving in 1902 at the Duke of York's Theatre, and The Adventures of Lady Ursula, Anthony Hope's 1898 play.

Buckstone's popular 1901 play Scrooge was quickly adapted by R.W. Paul for his film Scrooge, or, Marley's Ghost, the earliest known film adaptation of Charles Dickens' 1843 novel A Christmas Carol. Buckstone appeared in several early silent British films, including David Garrick (1913) and Scrooge (1913), starring Seymour Hicks as Ebenezer Scrooge.

References

External links
Buckstone  on the Internet Movie Database
Buckstone's Scrooge on the British Film Institute website
Buckstone on the Complete Index to World Film

1859 births
1924 deaths
English male film actors
English male stage actors
People from Sydenham, London
Male actors from Kent
20th-century English male actors